The Music Bank Chart is a record chart established in 1998 on the South Korean KBS television music program Music Bank. Every week during its live broadcast, the show gives an award for the best-performing single on the South Korean chart. The chart includes digital performance on domestic online music services (65%), album sales (5%), number of times the single was broadcast on KBS TV (20%), and viewers' choice (10%) in its ranking methodology. The score for domestic online music services is calculated using data from Melon, Bugs, Genie Music and Soribada. Actor and singer Park Bo-gum and Red Velvet member Irene, who had been the hosts of the show since May 2015, continued to do so until June 24, 2016. Kang Min-hyuk of CNBLUE and Laboum member Ahn Sol-bin were announced as new hosts the following week. Son Dong-woon from boy group Highlight appeared as a special host on the July 15 broadcast. Kang Min-hyuk left the show on November 4, and the following week Lee Seo-won was announced as the new host along with Ahn Sol-bin.

In 2016, 32 singles reached number one on the chart, and 24 acts were awarded first-place trophies. The year began with "Sing for You" by Exo at number one; it had been in the top spot on the last chart of 2015. "Cheer Up" and "TT" by Twice spent five weeks at number one, making both singles the most awarded songs of the year. The total of ten weeks which the singles spent at number one made Twice the act with the most wins of the year. Of all releases for the year Exo's "Monster" acquired the highest point total on the June 17 broadcast with a score of 11,570. The group achieved four number ones in 2016, the most of any act during the year: "Sing for You", "Monster", "Lotto" and "For Life". Member Baekhyun along with Miss A member Suzy won their first Music Bank trophy as soloists for their collaboration song "Dream".

A number of acts achieved their first number ones in 2016. Han Dong-geun won his first ever music show trophy on Music Bank with "Making a New Ending for This Story". Girl group GFriend had two number one singles on the chart achieved with "Rough" and "Navillera". Their win for "Rough" on the February 5 broadcast marked their first number one on Music Bank. Six other acts gained their first number ones on the chart, beginning with Mamamoo, who topped the chart in March with "You're the Best". Two other girl groups gained their first number one on the chart: Twice with "Cheer Up" and I.O.I with "Whatta Man" on the May 6 and August 19 broadcast respectively. The other first time chart toppers were Got7 with "Fly" and BtoB with "Remember That". Additionally, Seventeen made their first appearance at number one with "Boom Boom" on the December 16 broadcast. At the end of the year, "For Life" by Exo was at number one on the chart.

Chart history

Notes

References 

2016 in South Korean music
2016 record charts
Lists of number-one songs in South Korea